Agricultural communication (or agricultural communications) is a field that focuses on communication about agriculture-related information among agricultural stakeholders and between agricultural and non-agricultural stakeholders. Agriculture is broadly defined in this discipline to include not only farming, but also food, fiber (e.g., cotton), animals, rural issues, and natural resources. Agricultural communication is done formally and informally by agricultural extension and is considered related to science communication. However, it has evolved into its own professional field.

By definition, agricultural communicators are science communicators that deal exclusively with the diverse, applied science and business that is agriculture. An agricultural communicator is "expected to bring with him or her a level of specialized knowledge in the agricultural field that typically is not required of the mass communicator". Agricultural communication also addresses all subject areas related to the complex enterprises of food, feed, fiber, renewable energy, natural resource management, rural development and others, locally to globally. Furthermore, it spans all participants, from scientists to consumers - and all stages of those enterprises, from agricultural research and production to processing, marketing, consumption, nutrition and health.

A growing market for agricultural journalists and broadcasters led to the establishment of agricultural journalism and agricultural communication academic disciplines.

The job market for agricultural communicators includes:
Farm broadcasting
Journalists and editors of agricultural/rural magazines and newspapers
Communication specialist or public relations practitioner for agricultural commodity organizations, businesses, non-profits
Sales representative for agricultural business
Science journalist
Land-grant university communication specialist
Public relations or advertising for firms that specialize in or have agricultural clients

History 
The academic field originated from communication courses that taught students in the agricultural sciences how to communicate. Originally, agricultural journalists were needed to report farm news for a much larger agricultural and rural audience. As people moved from the farm to cities and suburbs, a much greater proportion of the population had less direct knowledge and experience regarding agriculture. While a need still exists for agricultural journalists, an equal, if not greater need exists for agricultural communicators who can act as liaisons between an industry with deeply rooted traditions and values and a public with little to no understanding of how agriculture operates and why it is the way it is.

Research 
The key journal in the field is the Journal of Applied Communications. Researchers have focused on a variety of areas examining consumer attitudes toward agricultural products and practices including genetic engineering and genetically modified food, natural and organic food and production, and food-related risks. Another area of research has been media coverage of agriculture and agricultural issues. Topics have included media coverage of bovine spongiform encephalopathy (mad cow disease), YouTube videos of California Proposition 2 (2008), and television news coverage of food safety scares.

The Agricultural Communications Documentation Center, maintained by the University of Illinois, compiles research and articles related to agriculture and communications as well.

Agricultural press and media

There is a wide variety of agricultural newspapers and magazines throughout the world. Radio programmes are frequently used for agricultural communication and Farm Radio International is a leading organization in providing programming to developing countries.

Academic programs 
Several colleges offer formal education at the undergraduate and graduate levels in the field of agricultural communication. What follows is a list with links directly to the programs.
Abraham Baldwin Agricultural College
California Polytechnic State University (Cal Poly)
Colorado State University 
Missouri State University
North Dakota State University
The Ohio State University
Oklahoma State University
Kansas State University
University of Florida
University of Georgia
University of Tennessee
University of Illinois
University of Missouri
University of Nebraska-Lincoln
University of Arkansas
University of Minnesota - Twin Cities
University of Wisconsin
University of Wyoming
Purdue University
Tennessee Technological University
Texas A&M University
Texas Tech University
West Texas A&M University
Utah State University

Approaches to Agricultural Communication 
Theoretically speaking, agricultural communication is an applied theoretical field. The academic curriculum and scholarly endeavors typically stay within the context of agriculture, natural resources, and occasionally, the life sciences. It examines communication and human dimension issues as they relate to a variety of issues in agriculture and natural resources. Agricultural journalism is not always differentiated from agricultural communications in research. One could argue that when research focuses on media coverage of agricultural issues or when it examines issues within agricultural journalism specifically (i.e., what influences editors of agriculture magazines to publish risk information), then it is more within the realm of agricultural journalism. Journalism is often seen as a subset of communication that is supposed to be fair and balanced like traditional journalism, whereas the broader field of agricultural communication could potentially be viewed as advocacy communication.

Agricultural communicators are expected to have a certain amount of knowledge and familiarity with agriculture. One could also add to that definition and say the communicator also brings with him or her an appreciation, or even affection, for the agriculture industry. While this is also probably true of agricultural journalists, they at least need to be cognizant of their potential bias to ensure they ask critical questions and present unbiased information. Agricultural journalists are trained like traditional journalists, but bring with them an understanding of agricultural systems and science either through experience and/or academic training.

References 

Agriculture
Science education